The Île Verte is an island off the south coast of Brittany in the north west of France, lying to the south of Finistère, near Trégunc and Nevez.

The island is a Daymark as an aid to navigation by sailors.

See also 
 Daymark

Trégunc
Islands of Brittany
Landforms of Finistère